The 2022 UNOH 200 presented by Ohio Logistics was the 20th stock car race of the 2022 NASCAR Camping World Truck Series, the first race of the Round of 8, and the 25th iteration of the event. The race was held on Thursday, September 15, 2022, in Bristol, Tennessee at Bristol Motor Speedway, a  permanent oval-shaped racetrack. The race took the scheduled 200 laps to complete. Ty Majeski, driving for ThorSport Racing, dominated during the end of the final stages, and earned his first career NASCAR Camping World Truck Series win. He would also earn a spot in the championship 4. Chandler Smith dominated a majority of the race, leading 89 laps. To fill out the podium, Zane Smith, driving for Front Row Motorsports, and Parker Kligerman, driving for Henderson Motorsports, would finish 2nd and 3rd, respectively.

This was the debut race for the full-time ARCA Menards Series East driver, Leland Honeyman.

Background 
Bristol Motor Speedway, formerly known as Bristol International Raceway and Bristol Raceway, is a NASCAR short track venue located in Bristol, Tennessee. Constructed in 1960, it held its first NASCAR race on July 30, 1961. Bristol is among the most popular tracks on the NASCAR schedule because of its distinct features, which include extraordinarily steep banking, an all-concrete surface, two pit roads, and stadium-like seating. It has also been named one of the loudest NASCAR tracks. The track is billed as the "World's Fastest Half-Mile", even though that designation technically belongs to the Volusia Speedway Park dirt track.

Entry list 

 (R) - denotes rookie driver
 (i) - denotes driver who is ineligible for series driver points.

Practice 
For practice, drivers will be separated into two groups, Group A and B. Both sessions will be 15 minutes long, and was held on Thursday, September 15, at 4:30 PM EST.

Qualifying 
Qualifying was held on Thursday, September 15, at 5:05 PM EST. Since Bristol Motor Speedway is a short track, the qualifying system used is a single-car, two-lap system with only one round. Whoever sets the fastest time in the round wins the pole.

Race results 
Stage 1 Laps: 55

Stage 2 Laps: 55

Stage 3 Laps: 90

Standings after the race 

Drivers' Championship standings

Note: Only the first 10 positions are included for the driver standings.

References 

2022 NASCAR Camping World Truck Series
NASCAR races at Bristol Motor Speedway
UNOH 200
2022 in sports in Tennessee